Target is a 30-minute American television anthology series produced by Ziv Television Programs, Inc. for first-run syndication.  A total of 38 episodes were aired in 1958.

The show was hosted by Adolphe Menjou.  Guest stars included Angie Dickinson, Dyan Cannon, Gene Barry, Macdonald Carey, Frances Bavier, Bonita Granville, Cesare Romero, Hugh Marlowe, and Lee Van Cleef, as well as Howard Duff, Kent Taylor, Hans Conried, Marie Windsor, and Lon Chaney Jr.

Episodes

References

External links

Target at CVTA.biz with list of episodes

1950s American anthology television series
1958 American television series debuts
1958 American television series endings
First-run syndicated television programs in the United States
Black-and-white American television shows